Scuticaria okinawae is a moray eel found in the Pacific and Indian Oceans. It is commonly known as the shorttailed snake moray, shorttail moray, Seale's moray eel, or the Bennett's moray.

Description
The shorttail moray is uniform gray or brown in color, and attains a length of up to  SL.

Taxonomy
Scutaria okinawae was previously referred to as Gymnomuraena bennetti, Scuticaria bennetti, or Uropterygius bennetti in a number of publications (Smith 1962; McCosker et al. 1984; Randall 1996). However, Böhlke and McCosker (1997) demonstrated that Gymnomuraena bennetti is a junior synonym of Channomuraena vittata, so they resurrected okinawae for the eel previously misidentified as bennetti. Uropterygius unicolor Seale, 1917 (given the unnecessary replacement name U. sealei Whitley, 1932) and Gymnomuraena brevicauda Regan, 1903 are synonyms.

References

External links
 

Muraenidae
Fish described in 1901
Taxa named by David Starr Jordan